Košarkaški klub Dinamo, commonly referred to as Dinamo Pančevo, is a men's and women's basketball club based in Pančevo, Serbia. The men's team has been competing in the 4th-tier Second Regional League, West Division.

History
The club was founded in 1946 as KK Sloga. In the next year, they changed the name to Dinamo. The biggest success of the men's team was in 1961 when they played the Yugoslav First League. They finished that season with 1–17 record and got relegated. 

During the 1990s, the men's team worked mostly with youth. In 2006, the men's team joined with Tamiš in their work with youth selections.

In the 1996–97 season, the women's team won the Yugoslav League and the Yugoslav Cup. The women's team lost in semifinals in the 1996–97 Ronchetti Cup season.

Sponsorship naming 
The Dinamo women's team had several denominations through the years due to its sponsorship:

Men's team

Players

 Zlatko Sajkov – 1952–1968

Coaches

 Bela Bece – 1946
 Todor Lazić – 1959–1961, 1964–1967
 Branislav Rajačić – 1967
 Zlatko Sajkov – 1968
 Vladan Marković – 1968–1973 
 Srđan Vlajković – 1973–1976
 Branko Jokić – 1976–1977
 Borislav Ćorković – 1977–1978
 Todor Lazić – 1978–1980
 Dragoljub Pljakić – 1980–1981
 Mihajlo Pujić – 1983–1984
 Srđan Vlajković – 1984–1985
 Darko Jovičić – 2020–present

Women's team

Players
 Gordana Bogojević – 1996–1997

Coaches

 Todor Lazić – 1980–1982, 1983
 Miroslav Kanjevac – 1995–1997, 2006–2007

Trophies and awards

Trophies
Yugoslav Women's League
Winners (1) – 1996–97
Yugoslav Women's Cup
Winners (1) – 1997

Awards 
Yugoslav First League scoring leader
 Zlatko Sajkov – 1961

See also 
 List of basketball clubs in Serbia by major honours won
 FK Dinamo Pančevo
 KK Tamiš
 KK Profikolor

References

External links
 Profile on srbijasport.net

Basketball teams established in 1946
Dinamo
Dinamo
Dinamo
Dinamo
Pančevo
1946 establishments in Serbia